Huatan Township is a rural township in Changhua County, Taiwan.

History
Formerly called Katangkha.

Geography
Huatan encompasses  and a population of 44,309, including 22,688 males and 21,621 females as of January 2023.

Administrative divisions
The township comprises 18 villages, which are Baisha, Beikou, Huatan, Jindun, Liucuo, Lunya, Nankou, Qiaotou, Sanchun, Wantung, Wanya, Wende, Yanzhu, Yongchun, Zhangchun, Zhangsha, Zhongkou and Zhongzhuang Village.

Tourist attractions
 Hushan Temple

Transportation

 TRA Huatan Station

References

External links

  Huatan Government website